The women's freestyle 48 kilograms is a competition featured at the 2009 World Wrestling Championships, and was held at the Messecenter Herning exhibition center in Herning, Denmark on September 23.

This freestyle wrestling competition consists of a single-elimination tournament, with a repechage used to determine the winner of two bronze medals.

Results
Legend
F — Won by fall

Final

Top half

Bottom half

Repechage

References
Results Book, Page 72

Women's freestyle 48 kg
Olym